SYTË is an alt-pop band based in New York, US.

Biography 
SYTË (meaning "eyes" in Albanian) was formed in 2018 in Pristina, Kosovo by vocalist Nita Kaja and producer Drin Tashi. The duo soon expanded into a four-piece when Fatlind Ferati and Granit Havolli joined the band. Their first release is their EP, which came out on July 12th, 2018.

In 2018, they performed at Sunny Hill Festival, and in 2019 at Pop-Kultur Berlin Festival.

In August, 2019 they released their single "Feel It All" and in March, 2020 their single "Tail Light", announcing the release of their album Divine Computer. 

The single "The End" was listed on the "Top Awards" Albanian music chart on January, 2021.

In April 2021, they collaborated with London-based artist Qendresa, to release their single and music video "Up in the Air".

In 2022 they released two singles. The single "Where Did The Love Go" in March, and the single "Sirena" in September.

Influences 

Band's influences include Solange Knowles, Julian Casablancas, Thundercat, Marvin Gaye, and Radiohead.

Band members 
 Nita Kaja - vocals
 Drin Tashi - guitars, synths
 Fatlind Ferati - bass
 Granit Havolli - drums

Discography 

 EP (EP, 2018)
 "Feel It All" (single, 2019)
 "Tail Light" (single, 2020)
 Divine Computer (LP, 2020)
 "Up in the Air" (single, 2021)
 "Where Did the Love Go" (single, 2022)
 "Sirena" (single, 2022)

References 

Kosovo Albanians
Kosovan musical groups
Musical quartets
Musical groups established in 2018
Kosovan soul musical groups